Carabus azrael is a species of ground beetle in the large genus Carabus that is endemic to parts of China.

References

Insects of China

azrael
Insects described in 1932